Taras Viktorovych Kutovy (25 February 1976 – 21 October 2019) was a Ukrainian economist and politician.

On 14 April 2016, he was appointed minister of agrarian policy and food of Ukraine in the Groysman government. On 23 May 2017, he announced that he wanted to resign from this position and asked lawmakers to support his decision. On 22 November 2018, the parliament approved his resignation. Kutovy died in a helicopter crash in Ukraine's Poltava Oblast on 21 October 2019 at the age of 43.

References

External links

 	 

1976 births
2019 deaths
Politicians from Kyiv
National Academy of the Security Service of Ukraine alumni
Kyiv National Economic University alumni
21st-century Ukrainian economists
Seventh convocation members of the Verkhovna Rada
Eighth convocation members of the Verkhovna Rada
Ukrainian Democratic Alliance for Reform politicians
Independent politicians of Petro Poroshenko Bloc
Agriculture and food provision ministers of Ukraine
Victims of aviation accidents or incidents in Ukraine
Victims of helicopter accidents or incidents